Foxemys is an extinct genus of bothremydid turtle that was discovered at Fox Amphoux, France and also Hungary and Spain. Its skull and shell structure is similar to Polysternon. Two species are in the genus: F. mechinorum and F. trabanti.

Gallery

References

Bothremydidae
Late Cretaceous turtles
Fossils of France
Prehistoric turtle genera
Fossil taxa described in 1998